Oleg Vasilyevich Shein (born March 21, 1972 in Astrakhan, RSFSR, USSR) is a Russian trade union, social and political activist. He was a left-wing deputy of the State Duma's III, IV, V, VI and VII convocations. He joined the Duma's VI convocation only in April 2016, having been a deputy of the Astrakhan Oblast Duma between 2011 and 2016. He was Vice-president of the Confederation of Labour of Russia  and Co-chair of the Union of citizens. Shein is the author of several books on history.

Personal life 
Shein was married to French sociologist Carine Clément between 2002 and 2009. Shein does not smoke or drink alcohol, and has been a vegetarian since childhood.

References

External links
 
 Биография Олега Шеина на сайте партии «Справедливая Россия»

1972 births
Living people
People from Astrakhan
Russian socialists
A Just Russia politicians
21st-century Russian politicians
Saint Petersburg State University alumni
Third convocation members of the State Duma (Russian Federation)
Fourth convocation members of the State Duma (Russian Federation)
Fifth convocation members of the State Duma (Russian Federation)
Sixth convocation members of the State Duma (Russian Federation)
Seventh convocation members of the State Duma (Russian Federation)